Bernhard Siegfried Albinus (originally Weiss; 24 February 16979 September 1770) was a German-born Dutch anatomist. He served a professor of medicine at the University of Leiden like his father Bernhard Albinus (1653–1721). He also published a large-format artistic atlas of human anatomy, with engravings made by Jan Wandelaar.

Biography

Bernhard Siegfried Albinus was born at Frankfurt on the Oder where his father, Bernhard Albinus (1653–1721), was professor of the practice of medicine. In 1702 the latter was transferred to the chair of medicine at Leiden University, and it was there that Bernhard Siegfried began his studies in 1709, at the age of 12, having for his teachers such men as Boerhaave and Govert Bidloo. Having finished his studies at Leiden, he went to Paris in 1718, where, under the instruction of Sébastien Vaillant (1669–1722), Jacob Winslow (1669–1760) and Frederik Ruysch, he devoted himself especially to anatomy and botany. After a year's absence he was, on the recommendation of Boerhaave, recalled in 1719 to Leiden to be a lecturer on anatomy and surgery. Two years later, after Johannes Jacobus Rau (1668 - 1719) the former rector of the medical school died on 29 June 1719, Albinus received his position in 1721, and succeeded his father in the professorship of these subjects, and became a teacher of anatomy, his classroom being resorted to not only by students but by many practising physicians. In 1745 Albinus was appointed professor of the practice of medicine, being succeeded in the anatomical chair by his brother Frederick Bernhard (1715–1778), who, as well as another brother, Christian Bernhard (1700–1752), attained distinction. Bernhard Siegfried, who was twice rector of his university, died at Leiden.

Together with Hermann Boerhaave, he edited the works of the physicians Andreas Vesalius and William Harvey. Albinus is known for his Tabulae sceleti et musculorum corporis humani, an exquisitely illustrated volume, which was first published in Leiden in 1747, largely at his own expense. Albinus is thought to have spent 24000 florins for the work. The artist and engraver with whom Albinus did nearly all of his work was Jan Wandelaar (1690–1759). A From 1746 until his death, Wandelaar lived in Albinus's house. In an attempt to increase the scientific accuracy of anatomical illustration, Albinus and Wandelaar devised a new technique of placing nets with square webbing at specified intervals between the artist and the anatomical specimen and copying the images using the grid patterns. Albinus believed in the idea of "homo perfectus", an idealized perfect human model based on which all humans were derived as variants. In order to represent this perfect human, the illustrations were drawn from multiple specimens. Earlier anatomical drawings such as those accompanying Vesalius' work were drawn from single specimens. Albinus preferred athletic slender forms. Tabulae was criticized by such scholars as Petrus Camper, especially for the whimsical backgrounds added to many of the pieces by Wandelaar, but Albinus staunchly defended Wandelaar. Wandelaar made the first of the plates in 1742, well before the publication of the Tabulae, and this included the skeleton superposed in front of a rhinoceros. This was the famous rhinoceros Clara which at that time lived in Leiden and was extremely popular.

Publications

Oratio inauguralis de anatomia comparata. (Leiden, 1719, 4.)
Oratio inaug. qua in veram viam, quae ad fabricae corporis humanae cognitionem ducit, inquiritur. (Leiden, 1721, 4.)
Index supellectilis anatomicae, quam Academiae Batavae, quae Leidae est, legavit Iohannes Iacobus Ravius, rogatu Illustrissimorum et Amplissimorum academiae istius curatorum et urbis consulum confectus a Bernhard Siegfried Albino, qui et vitam ejus nec non merhodum curandi calculofos infimulque instrumentorum figuras addit. (Leiden, 1721, 4. c. fig.)
De ossibus corporis humani ad auditores fuos libellus. (Leiden, 1726, 8; which in Vienna, 1748 and 1757, in 8 was reprinted.)
Historia musculorum hominis. (Leiden, 1734, 1736, 4. c. fig. C. Möhsen portr. p. 128.
Dissertatio de arteriis et venis intestinorum hominis, adjecta icon coloribus distincta. (Leiden 1736, 1738, 4.)
Dissertatio secunda de sede et caussa coloris Aethiopum et caeterorum hominum; accedunt icones coloribus distinktae. (Leiden, 1737, 4.)
Icones officum foetus humani; accedit osteogeniae bevis historia. (Leiden, 1737, 4.)
Tabulae sceleti et musculorum corporis humani. (Leiden, 1747, 4.), greek Print London, 1749, Translated into English, London, 1752, greek print C. Moehsen Portr. p. 126
Uteri mulieris gravidae, cum jam parturiret, mortuae tabulae VII. (Leiden 1748), Print regional appendix, 1751, Pr. reg.
Tabulae ossium humanorum. (Leiden 1753), greek Print
Tabulae vatis chyliferi cum vena azygos, arteriis intercostalibus aliisque vicinis partibus. (Leiden 1757), Pr. reg.
Academicarum annotationum liber I.—VIII., (Leiden, 1754 — 1768, greek. 4.)
De sceleto humanum liber. (Leiden 1767, 4.), Andreae Vesalii opera omnia anatomica et chirurgica cura Herrmanni Boerhaave et Bernhardi Siegfried Albini. Tomus Primus (I.) et Secundus (II.) (Leiden, 1775), Print ca. figurative.
Hieronymi Fabricii ab Aquapendente opera omnia anatomica et physiologica hactenus, variis locis ac formis edita, nunc uno certo ordine digesta, et in unum volumen redacta. Accessit rerum et verhorum index complettissimus una cum praesatione B. S. Albini. (Leiden 1737, Print.)
Gulielmi Harvei opera, seu exercitatio anatomica de motu cordis et sanguinis in animalibus, atque exercitationes duae anatomicae de circulatione sanguinis ad Ioannes Riolanum filius et exercitationes de generatione animalum cum praefatione B. S. Albini. (Leiden 1736, 1737, 4; 2 Volumes. Leiden, 1757, 4., compare Balthasar. Eustachii Explicationes tabularum anatomicarum. Accedit nova tabularum editio, per B. S. Albinum. (Leiden, 1744, Print, Increased and improved, Leiden 1761, print.)

References

Notes

Citations

Sources

 Choulant, L. History and bibliography of anatomic illustration. Trans. and annotated by Mortimer Frank. (New York: Hafner, 1962).
 Ferguson, J. P. "The skeleton and the rhinoceros." Proceedings of the Royal College of Physicians of Edinburgh. 1989 Apr; 19(2): 231-2.
 
 
 
 
 Nordenskióld Erik "Bernhard Siegfried Albinus (1697–1770)", History of Biology, pp. 258–259 Illustration.

External links

 Bernhard Siegfried Albinus: Tabulae sceleti et musculorum corporis humani (London, 1749). Scanned from the original work. Historical Anatomies on the Web. US National Library of Medicine.

1697 births
1770 deaths
18th-century Latin-language writers
18th-century male writers
Dutch anatomists
18th-century Dutch anatomists
Dutch entomologists
Fellows of the Royal Society
Honorary members of the Saint Petersburg Academy of Sciences
German anatomists
Academic staff of Leiden University
Leiden University alumni
People from Frankfurt (Oder)
People from Leiden